Leonel Rocca (21 January 1915 – 19 June 1965) was a Uruguayan cyclist. He competed in the sprint event at the 1948 Summer Olympics.

References

1915 births
1965 deaths
Uruguayan male cyclists
Olympic cyclists of Uruguay
Cyclists at the 1948 Summer Olympics
People from Mercedes, Uruguay